Antonio Bailetti (born 29 September 1937) is an Italian former professional road bicycle racer who won a gold medal in the team time trial race at the 1960 Olympics. After that Bailetti turned professional. In 1962, he won a stage in the Tour de France and in the Giro d'Italia, after a 120 km solo escape; he repeated this achievement next year. He retired after a heavy fall in Spring 1969.

Major results

1960
 Olympic Games Team Time Trial (with Ottavio Cogliati, Giacomo Fornoni and Livio Trapé)
1961
Turbigo
Nyon
1962
Genoa–Nice
Maurs
Tour de France:
Winner stage 9
Giro d'Italia:
Winner stage 4
La Charité-sur-Loire
1963
Tour de France:
Winner stage 5
Giro d'Italia:
Winner stage 21
1965
Monaco
1966
Trofeo Laigueglia

References

External links

 
 
 
 
 

1937 births
Living people
Italian male cyclists
Italian Tour de France stage winners
Italian Giro d'Italia stage winners
Olympic gold medalists for Italy
Cyclists at the 1960 Summer Olympics
Olympic cyclists of Italy
Cyclists from the Province of Vicenza
Olympic medalists in cycling
Medalists at the 1960 Summer Olympics
20th-century Italian people